Yolka is the transliteration of the Russian word (ёлка) meaning spruce or fir. It may refer to:
 New Year tree specifically, in Russia
 Yolka (singer), Ukrainian pop singer